Ivry-sur-le-Lac is a village and municipality in the Laurentides region of Quebec, Canada, part of the Les Laurentides Regional County Municipality. The municipality completely encompasses Lake Manitou which is a popular cottage vacation location.

The village of Ivry-sur-le-Lac is located at the head of the north-east bay (Lacasse Bay), and the hamlet of Lac-Manitou-Sud is at the head of the south-east bay of Lake Manitou.

History
From 1852 onwards, settlers came to the shores of Lake Manitou because of its beauty. In 1891, Countess Angela Ogier d'Ivry, from Le Mans (France), bought a farm for her son Viscount Raoul Ogier d'Ivry, who chose the name of the new municipality which formed in 1912 by separating from the parishes of Sainte-Agathe and Saint-Faustin. The post office opened in 1903, designated as Lac-Manitou until 1913 and as Ivry-Nord until 1958.

On February 27, 2002, Ivry-sur-le-Lac was amalgamated with Sainte-Agathe-des-Monts in province-wide municipal reorganizations, but it was reinstated as a municipality on January 1, 2006.

Demographics
Population trend:
 Population in 2016: 387 (2011 to 2016 population change: -8.9%)
 Population in 2011: 425 (2006 to 2011 population change: 7.1%)
 Population in 2006: 397
 Population in 2001: 401
 Population in 1996: 346
 Population in 1991: 311

Private dwellings occupied by usual residents: 186 (total dwellings: 421)

Mother tongue:
 English as first language: 37.5%
 French as first language: 60%
 Other as first language: 2.5%

Education

Saint Agathe Academy of the Sir Wilfrid Laurier School Board in Sainte-Agathe-des-Monts serves English-speaking students in this community for both elementary and secondary levels.

References

External links

Incorporated places in Laurentides
Municipalities in Quebec